Motlatsi Mafatshe (born 1984), is a South African actor and musician. He is best known for his roles in the popular films State of Violence, Sokhulu &Partners II and Zama Zama. Apart from acting, he is also a musician who has made more than 400 singles.

Personal life
He was born on 1984 in Soweto, South Africa to a political family.

He is married to Millicent Nkangane, a fashion designer since November 2014. They first met in a church.

Career
He played the role 'Sechaba' on the popular SABC 3 soapie Isidingo first in 2010. After playing the role for more than nine years, he finally joined officially for the show's directing team in 2018. In 2019, he won the award for the Outstanding Lead Actor award at the Third Royalty Soapie Awards.

He also played the role as 'Wandile Dhlomo' in the soccer drama Shooting Stars. Then he appeared with the role 'Casper' on the series When We Were Black. In 2018, he co-produced the romcom Love Lives Here.

On 3 February 2006, he was attacked by hip hop artist Thulani Ngcobo aka 'Pitch Black Afro' at the South African premiere party for television serial Tsotsi.

Filmography

References

External links
 

Living people
South African male television actors
1984 births
South African male film actors
People from Soweto
South African musicians